Dorothy Lucie Sanders (4 May 1907 – 17 December 1987), better known under the pseudonym Lucy Walker, was a prolific and successful Australian romance novelist.

Personal life
Dorothy Lucie McClemans was born in Kalgoorlie, Western Australia, on 4 May 1907, the second of five daughters.  Her father, William McClemans, was an Irish minister of the Church of England.  Her mother, Ada Lucy Walker, was from New Zealand. After her parents divorced in 1928, her mother supported the family as a nurse and then as a Justice of the Peace.

A qualified teacher from Perth College (1928), Dorothy taught in state schools in Western Australia until 1936.  She continued teaching later in London while her husband, Colsell Sanders, a fellow school teacher whom she married in 1936, completed his doctorate in education. They returned to Perth, Australia in 1938.

During her life, Dorothy was a member of the State Library Board of Western Australia, the State Advisory Board to the Australian Broadcasting Commission, and the Children's Court.

Her eldest son, Jon Sanders, was a well-known yachtsman who set a record in a non-stop solo triple circumnavigation of the globe. It was during this voyage that both of his parents died. Colsell Sanders died in 1986 and Dorothy Sanders died at Menora on 17 December 1987.

Writing career
She began writing in 1945, producing articles, poetry, short stories, and later novels. In 1948 her first novel, Fairies on the Doorstep, was published. During her writing career, she published as Lucy Walker, Shelley Dean, and Dorothy Lucie Sanders. The London Daily Mirror named her "Australia's Queen of Romance". During the 1970s, several of her romance novels were serialized in Women's Weekly, bowlderized to meet the restrictive editorial requirements of the magazine.

As Lucy Walker, she wrote about 39 romance books over a thirty-year career. Popular in the United States and England, more than a million copies of her books were sold. Walker's romance novels were distinguished by their Outback settings.

Walker was an active member of the Australian Society of Authors and Fellowship of Australian Authors, and a member of the Society of Women Writers and Journalists, London.

In Germaine Greer's The Female Eunuch, Walker's romance novel The Loving Heart is used to illustrate that the traits of romance novel heroes "have been invented by women cherishing the chains of their bondage". Greer claimed the novel expressed a foot fetish and criticized the "infantile" heroine.

In an interview, Walker expressed her regret that the popularity of her romance novels detracted from her other novels and kept her from pursuing more serious writing. She said, "I am not unproud of Lucy Walker but I'll never really be sure of what I could have done without her...I used to think that if I had been given the chance I could have written The Great Australian Novel."

Bibliography
Novels are listed by name of author and chronologically.

Dorothy Lucie Sanders
Faeries on the Doorstep, 1948
Six for Heaven, 1952
Monday in Summer, 1954
Shining River, 1954
Waterfall, 1956
Ribbons in Her Hair, 1957
Pepper Tree Bay, 1959

Lucy Walker
The One Who Kisses, 1954
Sweet and Faraway, 1955
Come Home, Dear, 1956
Heaven is Here, 1957
Master of Ransome, 1958
The Orchard Hill, 1958
Kingdom of the Heart, 1959
The Stranger from the North, 1959
Love in a Cloud, 1960
The Loving Heart, 1960
The Moonshiner, 1961
Wife to Order, 1961
The Distant Hills, 1962
Down in the Forest, 1962
The Call of the Pines, 1963
Follow Your Star, 1963
A Man Called Masters, 1963
The Man from Outback, 1964
The Ranger in the Hills, 1965
The Other Girl, 1965
The River is Down, 1966
Reaching for the Stars, 1966
The Gone-Away Man, 1968
Home at Sundown, 1968
Joyday for Jodi, 1971
The Mountain That Went to the Sea, 1971
Girl Alone, 1973
The Runaway Girl, 1975
Gamma's Girl, 1977

Shelley Dean
South Sea Island, 1966
Island in the South, 1967

References

1907 births
1987 deaths
20th-century Australian novelists
20th-century Australian short story writers
20th-century Australian women writers
Australian people of Irish descent
Australian people of New Zealand descent
Australian women novelists
Australian women short story writers
Pseudonymous women writers
Writers from Western Australia
20th-century pseudonymous writers
People educated at Perth College (Western Australia)
People from Kalgoorlie